Adolph Held (May 16, 1885 – May 14, 1969) was a Galician-born Jewish American newspaper editor, banker, and labor activist.

Life 
Held was born on May 16, 1885 in Boryslav, Austro-Hungarian Empire, the son of Jacob Held and Tauba Yetta Singer. He immigrated to America in 1893.

Held attended the College of the City of New York, graduating from there with a B.S. in 1906. From 1907 to 1912, he was the city editor of The Jewish Daily Forward, a leading Yiddish socialist newspaper. From 1912 to 1917, he worked as its business manager. In 1917, he was elected as a Socialist to the New York City Board of Aldermen Fourth District, defeating Democrat Henry S. Schimmel. He ran for re-election in 1919, but he lost to Louis Zeltner, who ran with support from both Republicans and Democrats.

In 1920, Held was appointed European director of the Hebrew Immigrant Aid Society. In that capacity, he assisted hundreds of thousands of Jews immigrating to the United States. When he returned to America in 1924, he became president of the Forward Association, the Forward's governing body. From 1925 to 1928, he served as vice-president of the Amalgamated Bank. He became president of the bank in 1928, and during the Wall Street Crash of 1929 it was considered one of the safest banks in the city. He was chairman of the board of directors of the radio station WEVD and chairman of the Amalgamated Co-operative Housing Association. After he relinquished the presidency of the Amalgamated Bank in 1945, he became welfare director of the International Ladies Garment Workers Union. He was a central figure in founding the Jewish Labor Committee in 1933, serving as its president emeritus when he died. He was president of the Golden Ring Council of Senior Citizens and was active in extending Social Security payments and establishing Medicare. He was president of the Forward Association until 1962, when he became general manager of the Forward. He retired from that position in 1967. 

He was a member of the presidium of the Conference on Jewish Material Claims Against Germany in 1952. With Louis Hollander, he was a founder of ORT, chairman of the American Labor ORT, member of the central board of the World ORT Union, and vice president of the American ORT Federation. He was a founder and member of the JDC and a member of the Israel Bond Organization.

Held was a member of the Workmen's Circle. In 1913, he married Lillian Michaels. She died in 1954, and they had no children.

Held died in the Workmen’s Circle Home and Hospital for the Aged in the Bronx on May 14, 1969. He was buried in Mount Hebron Cemetery.

References 

1885 births
1969 deaths
People from Boryslav
Jews from Galicia (Eastern Europe)
Austro-Hungarian Jews
American people of Ukrainian-Jewish descent
City College of New York alumni
20th-century American newspaper editors
Editors of New York City newspapers
20th-century American politicians
Politicians from Manhattan
Socialist Party of America politicians from New York (state)
New York City Council members
American bank presidents
Jewish American community activists
Jewish American bankers
Jewish American trade unionists
Trade unionists from New York (state)
International Ladies Garment Workers Union leaders
Burials at Mount Hebron Cemetery (New York City)
Austro-Hungarian emigrants to the United States